The 1996 Bangalore Mahanagara Palike (Bangalore City Corporation) election was held in October 1996 in all 100 Wards of Bangalore

Background 
In 1989, the BMP expanded to include 87 wards and further increased to 100 wards in 1995, covering an extra area of 75 sq. km. The council also included 40 additional members drawn from the parliament and the state legislature.
The tenure of the Bangalore Mahanagara Palike ended in May 1995. A new election was necessary to elect new Corporators and Mayor

Around the same time, the BMP council passed a resolution that only BDA layouts should be included in its limits and not revenue pockets, because of the cost of developing the latter. Around 50 per cent of the expanded BMP areas (meaning at least 40 wards among 100) were revenue pockets at that time. At that time, the BMP proposed betterment charges of Rs.215/sq. yard based on costs of developing those areas. But after the BMP elections of 1996, the council took a decision to reduce betterment charges to Rs.100/sq. yard. The state government (the H. D. Deve Gowda led administration) then issued a notice to the city council demanding why the latter reduced the rates. Subsequently, the state government agreed to the BMP rates.

Organization 
New Mayor will be elected for a term of one year and Corporators will be in office for 5 years

Schedule 
The schedule of the election was announced by the State Election Commission in August 1996 and date of counting / announcement of result was in October 1996

Results

See also 
 List of wards in Bangalore (1995-2006)
 List of wards in Bangalore
 Elections in Karnataka
 Bangalore Mahanagara Palike

References

1990s in Karnataka
1990s in Bangalore
Elections in Bangalore
1996 elections in India